Suzie Wong is a multimedia franchise set in Hong Kong, originating from the 1957 novel "The World of Suzie Wong" written by Richard Mason. It centres around the fictional prostitute Suzie Wong. The franchise inspired the term "Suzie Wong" for describing a particular type of East Asian woman, and prostitutes in general, especially in Southeast Asia during the Vietnam War era.

List of works
The World of Suzie Wong (1957 novel) by Richard Mason
The World of Suzie Wong (1958 stage play) adapted by Paul Osborn
The World of Suzie Wong (1960 film)
 "A Brave New World of Suzie Wong" (2001 theatrical dance) adapted by Yuri Ng
 "Suzie Wong" (2006 ballet) adapted by Stephen Jefferies, and scored by Chris Babida
For Goodness Sake: A Novel of the Afterlife of Suzie Wong (2008 novel) by James Clapp writing as Sebastian Gerard, an unofficial unauthorized sequel
Suzie (2010 novel) by Leon Pang, an unofficial unauthorized sequel

References

Prostitution